Iarlaith Daly (born 2000) is an Irish hurler who plays for Waterford Senior Championship club Lismore and at inter-county level with the Waterford senior hurling team. He usually lines out as a left wing-back.

Playing career

Waterford

Daly first played for Waterford at minor level during the 2017 Munster Minor Championship, lining out in three successive defeats during the short-lived campaign. After one season in the minor grade, Daly was drafted onto the Waterford under-21/under-20 team. His two seasons in these grades ended with first-round Munster Championship defeats in both 2018 and 2019.

Daly was added to the Waterford senior hurling team in advance of the 2020 season. He made his first appearance for the team on 29 December 2019 when he lined out at right wing-back in a 1-17 t 1-13 defeat by Cork in the pre-season Munster League. Daly was retained on the training panel for the subsequent National League and was selected on the starting fifteen for Waterford's first two games of the campaign. Daly made his championship debut on 28 November 2020 when he was introduced as a 61st-minute substitute for Kevin Moran in a 2-27 to 2-23 defeat of Kilkenny in the All-Ireland semi-final.

Career statistics

References

1999 births
Living people
Lismore hurlers
Waterford inter-county hurlers